Semiconductor device fabrication is the process used to manufacture semiconductor devices, typically integrated circuits (ICs) such as computer processors, microcontrollers, and memory chips (such as NAND flash and DRAM) that are present in everyday electrical and electronic devices. It is a multiple-step photolithographic and physico-chemical process (with steps such as thermal oxidation, thin-film deposition, ion-implantation, etching) during which electronic circuits are gradually created on a wafer, typically made of pure single-crystal semiconducting material. Silicon is almost always used, but various compound semiconductors are used for specialized applications.

The fabrication process is performed in highly specialized semiconductor fabrication plants, also called foundries or "fabs",  with the central part being the "clean room". In more advanced semiconductor devices, such as modern 14/10/7 nm nodes, fabrication can take up to 15 weeks, with 11–13 weeks being the industry average. Production in advanced fabrication facilities is completely automated and carried out in a hermetically sealed nitrogen environment to improve yield (the percent of microchips that function correctly in a wafer), with automated material handling systems taking care of the transport of wafers from machine to machine. Wafers are transported inside FOUPs, special sealed plastic boxes. All machinery and FOUPs contain an internal nitrogen atmosphere. The insides of the processing equipment and FOUPs is kept cleaner than the surrounding air in the cleanroom. This internal atmosphere is known as a mini-environment. Fabrication plants need large amounts of liquid nitrogen to maintain the atmosphere inside production machinery and FOUPs, which are constantly purged with nitrogen.

Feature size

A specific semiconductor process has specific rules on the minimum size (width or CD) and spacing for features on each layer of the chip.
Normally a new semiconductor processes has smaller minimum sizes and tighter spacing.  In some cases this allows a simple die shrink of a currently produced chip design to reduce costs, improve performance, and increase transistor density (number of transistors per square millimeter) without the expense of a new design. 

Early semiconductor processes had arbitrary names such as HMOS III, CHMOS V. Later each new generation process became known as a technology node or process node, designated by the process’s minimum feature size in nanometers (or historically micrometers) of the process's transistor gate length, such as the "90 nm process". However, this has not been the case since 1994, and the number of nanometers used to name process nodes (see the International Technology Roadmap for Semiconductors) has become more of a marketing term that has no relation with actual feature sizes or transistor density (number of transistors per square millimeter).

Initially transistor gate length was smaller than that suggested by the process node name (e.g. 350 nm node); however this trend reversed in 2009. For example, Intel's former 10 nm process  actually has features (the tips of FinFET fins) with a width of 7 nm, so the Intel 10 nm process is similar in transistor density to TSMC's 7 nm process. GlobalFoundries' 12 and 14 nm processes have similar feature sizes.

History

20th century
An improved type of MOSFET technology, CMOS, was developed by Chih-Tang Sah and Frank Wanlass at Fairchild Semiconductor in 1963. CMOS was commercialised by RCA in the late 1960s. RCA commercially used CMOS for its 4000-series integrated circuits in 1968, starting with a 20µm process before gradually scaling to a 10 µm process over the next several years.

Semiconductor device manufacturing has since spread from Texas and California in the 1960s to the rest of the world, including Asia, Europe, and the Middle East.

21st century
The semiconductor industry is a global business today. The leading semiconductor manufacturers typically have facilities all over the world. Samsung Electronics, the world's largest manufacturer of semiconductors, has facilities in South Korea and the US. Intel, the second-largest manufacturer, has facilities in Europe and Asia as well as the US. TSMC, the world's largest pure play foundry, has facilities in Taiwan, China, Singapore, and the US. Qualcomm and Broadcom are among the biggest fabless semiconductor companies, outsourcing their production to companies like TSMC. They also have facilities spread in different countries.

Since 2009, "node" has become a commercial name for marketing purposes that indicates new generations of process technologies, without any relation to gate length, metal pitch or gate pitch. For example, GlobalFoundries' 7 nm process is similar to Intel's 10 nm process, thus the conventional notion of a process node has become blurred. Additionally, TSMC and Samsung's 10 nm processes are only slightly denser than Intel's 14 nm in transistor density. They are actually much closer to Intel's 14 nm process than they are to Intel's 10 nm process (e.g. Samsung's 10 nm processes' fin pitch is the exact same as that of Intel's 14 nm process: 42 nm).

As of 2019, 14 nanometer and 10 nanometer chips are in mass production by Intel, UMC, TSMC, Samsung, Micron, SK Hynix, Toshiba Memory and GlobalFoundries, with 7 nanometer process chips in mass production by TSMC and Samsung, although their 7nanometer node definition is similar to Intel's 10 nanometer process. The 5 nanometer process began being produced by Samsung in 2018. As of 2019, the node with the highest transistor density is TSMC's 5nanometer N5 node, with a density of 171.3million transistors per square millimeter. In 2019, Samsung and TSMC announced plans to produce 3 nanometer nodes. GlobalFoundries has decided to stop the development of new nodes beyond 12 nanometers in order to save resources, as it has determined that setting up a new fab to handle sub-12 nm orders would be beyond the company's financial abilities. , Samsung is the industry leader in advanced semiconductor scaling, followed by TSMC and then Intel.

List of steps

This is a list of processing techniques that are employed numerous times throughout the construction of a modern electronic device; this list does not necessarily imply a specific order, nor that all techniques are taken during manufacture as, in practice the order and which techniques are applied, are often specific to process offerings by foundries, or specific to an integrated device manufacturer (IDM) for their own products, and a semiconductor device may not need all techniques. Equipment for carrying out these processes is made by a handful of companies. All equipment needs to be tested before a semiconductor fabrication plant is started. These processes are done after integrated circuit design.
 Wafer processing
 Wet cleans
 Cleaning by solvents such as acetone, trichloroethylene and ultrapure water
 Piranha solution
 RCA clean
 Surface passivation
 Photolithography
 Photoresist coating (often as a liquid, on the entire wafer)
 Photoresist baking (solidification in an oven)
 Exposure (in a photolithography mask aligner, stepper or scanner)
 Development (removal of parts of the resist by application of a development liquid, leaving  only parts of the wafer exposed for ion implantation, layer deposition, etching, etc)
 Ion implantation (in which dopants are embedded in the wafer creating regions of increased or decreased conductivity)
Etching (microfabrication)
 Dry etching (Plasma etching)
 Reactive-ion etching (RIE)
Deep reactive-ion etching (DRIE)
 Atomic layer etching (ALE)
 Wet etching
Buffered oxide etch
 Chemical vapor deposition (CVD)
 Atomic layer deposition (ALD)
 Physical vapor deposition (PVD)
 Molecular beam epitaxy (MBE)
 Plasma ashing (for complete photoresist removal, historically done with a chemical solvent, to allow wafers to undergo another round of photolithography)
 Thermal treatments
 Rapid thermal anneal
 Furnace anneals
 Thermal oxidation
 Laser lift-off (for LED production)
 Electrochemical deposition (ECD).  See Electroplating
 Chemical-mechanical polishing (CMP)
 Wafer testing (where the electrical performance is verified using Automatic Test Equipment, binning and/or laser trimming may also be carried out at this step)
 Die preparation
 Through-silicon via manufacture (For three-dimensional integrated circuits)
 Wafer mounting (wafer is mounted onto a metal frame using Dicing tape)
 Wafer backgrinding and polishing (reduces the thickness of the wafer for thin devices like a smartcard or PCMCIA card or wafer bonding and stacking, this can also occur during wafer dicing, in a process known as Dice Before Grind or DBG)
 Wafer bonding and stacking (For Three-dimensional integrated circuits and MEMS)
 Redistribution layer manufacture (for WLCSP packages)
 Wafer Bumping (For Flip chip BGA (Ball grid array), and WLCSP packages)
 Die cutting or Wafer dicing
 IC packaging
 Die attachment (The die is attached to a leadframe using conductive paste or die attach film)
 IC bonding: Wire bonding, Thermosonic bonding, Flip chip or Tape Automated Bonding (TAB)
 IC encapsulation or integrated heat spreader (IHS) installation
 Molding (using special plastic molding compound that may contain glass powder as filler to control thermal expansion)
 Baking
 Electroplating (plates the copper leads of the lead frames with tin to make soldering easier)
 Laser marking or silkscreen printing
 Trim and form (separates the lead frames from each other, and bends the lead frame's pins so that they can be mounted on a Printed circuit board)
 IC testing

Additionally steps such as Wright etch may be carried out.

Prevention of contamination and defects

When feature widths were far greater than about 10 micrometres, semiconductor purity was not as big of an issue as it is today in device manufacturing. As devices become more integrated, cleanrooms must become even cleaner.  Today, fabrication plants are pressurized with filtered air to remove even the smallest particles, which could come to rest on the wafers and contribute to defects. The ceilings of semiconductor cleanrooms have fan filter units (FFUs) at regular intervals to constantly replace and filter the air in the cleanroom; semiconductor capital equipment may also have  their own FFUs. The FFUs, combined with raised floors with grills, help ensure a laminar air flow, to ensure that particles are immediately brought down to the floor and do not stay suspended in the air due to turbulence. The workers in a semiconductor fabrication facility are required to wear cleanroom suits to protect the devices from human contamination. To prevent oxidation and to increase yield, FOUPs and semiconductor capital equipment may have a hermetically sealed pure nitrogen environment with ISO class 1 level of dust. FOUPs and SMIF pods isolate the wafers from the air in the cleanroom, increasing yield because they reduce the number of defects caused by dust particles. Also, fabs have as few people as possible in the cleanroom to make maintaining the cleanroom environment easier, since people, even when wearing cleanroom suits, shed large amounts of particles, especially when walking.

Wafers

A typical wafer is made out of extremely pure silicon that is grown into mono-crystalline cylindrical ingots (boules) up to 300 mm (slightly less than 12 inches) in diameter using the Czochralski process. These ingots are then sliced into wafers about 0.75 mm thick and polished to obtain a very regular and flat surface.

Processing

In semiconductor device fabrication, the various processing steps fall into four general categories:  deposition, removal, patterning, and modification of electrical properties.
 Deposition is any process that grows, coats, or otherwise transfers a material onto the wafer.  Available technologies include physical vapor deposition (PVD), chemical vapor deposition (CVD), electrochemical deposition (ECD), molecular beam epitaxy (MBE), and more recently, atomic layer deposition (ALD) among others. Deposition can be understood to include oxide layer formation, by thermal oxidation or, more specifically, LOCOS.
 Removal is any process that removes material from the wafer; examples include etch processes (either wet or dry) and chemical-mechanical planarization (CMP).
 Patterning is the shaping or altering of deposited materials, and is generally referred to as lithography. For example, in conventional lithography, the wafer is coated with a chemical called a photoresist; then, a machine called an aligner or stepper focuses a mask image on the wafer using short-wavelength light; the exposed regions (for "positive" resist) are washed away by a developer solution. After  Removal  or other processing, the remaining photoresist is removed by "dry" plasma ashing or "wet" chemistry.
 Modification of electrical properties has historically entailed doping transistor sources and drains and polysilicon (originally by diffusion furnaces and later by ion implantation). These doping processes are followed by furnace annealing or, in advanced devices, by rapid thermal annealing (RTA) to activate the dopants. Modification of electrical properties now also extends to the reduction of a material's dielectric constant in low-κ insulators via exposure to ultraviolet light in UV processing (UVP). Modification is frequently achieved by oxidation, which can be carried out to create semiconductor-insulator junctions, such as in the local oxidation of silicon (LOCOS) to fabricate metal oxide field effect transistors. Modern chips have up to eleven or more metal levels produced in over 300 or more sequenced processing steps.

Front-end-of-line (FEOL) processing

FEOL processing refers to the formation of the transistors directly in the silicon. The raw wafer is engineered by the growth of an ultrapure, virtually defect-free silicon layer through epitaxy.  In the most advanced logic devices, prior to the silicon epitaxy step, tricks are performed to improve the performance of the transistors to be built.  One method involves introducing a straining step wherein a silicon variant such as silicon-germanium (SiGe) is deposited.  Once the epitaxial silicon is deposited, the crystal lattice becomes stretched somewhat, resulting in improved electronic mobility.  Another method, called silicon on insulator technology involves the insertion of an insulating layer between the raw silicon wafer and the thin layer of subsequent silicon epitaxy.  This method results in the creation of transistors with reduced parasitic effects.

Gate oxide and implants

Front-end surface engineering is followed by growth of the gate dielectric (traditionally silicon dioxide), patterning of the gate, patterning of the source and drain regions, and subsequent implantation or diffusion of dopants to obtain the desired complementary electrical properties. In dynamic random-access memory (DRAM) devices, storage capacitors are also fabricated at this time, typically stacked above the access transistor (the now defunct DRAM manufacturer Qimonda implemented these capacitors with trenches etched deep into the silicon surface).

Back-end-of-line (BEOL) processing

Metal layers
Once the various semiconductor devices have been created, they must be interconnected to form the desired electrical circuits. This occurs in a series of wafer processing steps collectively referred to as BEOL (not to be confused with back end of chip fabrication, which refers to the packaging and testing stages). BEOL processing involves creating metal interconnecting wires that are isolated by dielectric layers. The insulating material has traditionally been a form of SiO2 or a silicate glass, but recently new low dielectric constant materials are being used (such as silicon oxycarbide), typically providing dielectric constants around 2.7 (compared to 3.82 for SiO2), although materials with constants as low as 2.2 are being offered to chipmakers. High-κ dielectrics may be used instead.

Interconnect

Historically, the metal wires have been composed of aluminum.  In this approach to wiring (often called subtractive aluminum), blanket films of aluminum are deposited first, patterned, and then etched, leaving isolated wires.  Dielectric material is then deposited over the exposed wires.  The various metal layers are interconnected by etching holes (called "vias") in the insulating material and then depositing tungsten in them with a CVD technique using tungsten hexafluoride; this approach can still be (and often is) used in the fabrication of many memory chips such as dynamic random-access memory (DRAM), because the number of interconnect levels can be small (no more than four).

More recently, as the number of interconnect levels for logic has substantially increased due to the large number of transistors that are now interconnected in a modern microprocessor, the timing delay in the wiring has become so significant as to prompt a change in wiring material (from aluminum to copper interconnect layer) and a change in dielectric material (from silicon dioxides to newer low-κ insulators). This performance enhancement also comes at a reduced cost via damascene processing, which eliminates processing steps. As the number of interconnect levels increases, planarization of the previous layers is required to ensure a flat surface prior to subsequent lithography. Without it, the levels would become increasingly crooked, extending outside the depth of focus of available lithography, and thus interfering with the ability to pattern. CMP (chemical-mechanical planarization) is the primary processing method to achieve such planarization, although dry etch back is still sometimes employed when the number of interconnect levels is no more than three. Copper interconnects use an electrically conductive barrier layer to prevent the copper from diffusing into ("poisoning") its surroundings.

Wafer test
The highly serialized nature of wafer processing has increased the demand for metrology in between the various processing steps.  For example, thin film metrology based on ellipsometry or reflectometry is used to tightly control the thickness of gate oxide, as well as the thickness, refractive index, and extinction coefficient of photoresist and other coatings. Wafer test metrology equipment is used to verify that the wafers haven't been damaged by previous processing steps up until testing; if too many dies on one wafer have failed, the entire wafer is scrapped to avoid the costs of further processing. Virtual metrology has been used to predict wafer properties based on statistical methods without performing the physical measurement itself.

Device test

Once the front-end process has been completed, the semiconductor devices or chips are subjected to a variety of electrical tests to determine if they function properly. The percent of devices on the wafer found to perform properly is referred to as the yield. Manufacturers are typically secretive about their yields, but it can be as low as 30%, meaning that only 30% of the chips on the wafer work as intended. Process variation is one among many reasons for low yield. Testing is carried out to prevent faulty chips from being assembled into relatively expensive packages.

The yield is often but not necessarily related to device (die or chip) size. As an example, In December 2019, TSMC announced an average yield of ~80%, with a peak yield per wafer of >90% for their 5nm test chips with a die size of 17.92 mm2. The yield went down to 32.0% with an increase in die size to 100 mm2. The number of killer defects on a wafer, regardless of die size, can be noted as the defect density (or D0) of the wafer per unit area, usually cm2. 

The fab tests the chips on the wafer with an electronic tester that presses tiny probes against the chip.  The machine marks each bad chip with a drop of dye.  Currently, electronic dye marking is possible if wafer test data (results) are logged into a central computer database and chips are "binned" (i.e. sorted into virtual bins) according to predetermined test limits such as maximum operating frequencies/clocks, number of working (fully functional) cores per chip, etc. The resulting binning data can be graphed, or logged, on a wafer map to trace manufacturing defects and mark bad chips. This map can also be used during wafer assembly and packaging. Binning allows chips that would otherwise be rejected to be reused in lower-tier products, as is the case with GPUs and CPUs, increasing device yield, especially since very few chips are fully functional (have all cores functioning correctly, for example). eFUSEs may be used to disconnect parts of chips such as cores, either because they didn't work as intended during binning, or as part of market segmentation (using the same chip for low, mid and high-end tiers). Chips may have spare parts to allow the chip to fully pass testing even if it has several non-working parts.

Chips are also tested again after packaging, as the bond wires may be missing, or analog performance may be altered by the package.  This is referred to as the "final test". Chips may also be imaged using x-rays.

Usually, the fab charges for testing time, with prices in the order of cents per second. Testing times vary from a few milliseconds to a couple of seconds, and the test software is optimized for reduced testing time. Multiple chip (multi-site) testing is also possible because many testers have the resources to perform most or all of the tests in parallel and on several chips at once.

Chips are often designed with "testability features" such as scan chains or a "built-in self-test" to speed testing and reduce testing costs. In certain designs that use specialized analog fab processes, wafers are also laser-trimmed during testing, in order to achieve tightly distributed resistance values as specified by the design.

Good designs try to test and statistically manage corners (extremes of silicon behavior caused by a high operating temperature combined with the extremes of fab processing steps). Most designs cope with at least 64 corners.

Device yield
Device yield or die yield is the number of working chips or dies on a wafer, given in percentage since the number of chips on a wafer (Die per wafer, DPW) can vary depending on the chips' size and the wafer's diameter. Yield degradation is a reduction in yield, which historically was mainly caused by dust particles, however since the 1990s, yield degradation is mainly caused by process variation, the process itself and by the tools used in chip manufacturing, although dust still remains a problem in many older fabs. Dust particles have an increasing effect on yield as feature sizes are shrunk with newer processes. Automation and the use of mini environments inside of production equipment, FOUPs and SMIFs have enabled a reduction in defects caused by dust particles. Device yield must be kept high to reduce the selling price of the working chips since working chips have to pay for those chips that failed, and to reduce the cost of wafer processing. Yield can also be affected by the design and operation of the fab.

Tight control over contaminants and the production process are necessary to increase yield. Contaminants may be chemical contaminants or be dust particles. "Killer defects" are those caused by dust particles that cause complete failure of the device (such as a transistor). There are also harmless defects. A particle needs to be 1/5 the size of a feature to cause a killer defect. So if a feature is 100 nm across, a particle only needs to be 20 nm across to cause a killer defect. Electrostatic electricity can also affect yield adversely. Chemical contaminants or impurities include heavy metals such as iron, copper, nickel, zinc, chromium, gold, mercury and silver, alkali metals such as sodium, potassium and lithium, and elements such as aluminum, magnesium, calcium, chlorine, sulfur, carbon, and fluorine. It is important for these elements to not remain in contact with the silicon, as they could reduce yield. Chemical mixtures may be used to remove these elements from the silicon; different mixtures are effective against different elements.

Several models are used to estimate yield. They are Murphy's model, Poisson's model, the binomial model, Moore's model and Seeds' model. There is no universal model; a model has to be chosen based on actual yield distribution (the location of defective chips) For example, Murphy's model assumes that yield loss occurs more at the edges of the wafer (non-working chips are concentrated on the edges of the wafer), Poisson's model assumes that defective dies are spread relatively evenly across the wafer, and Seeds's model assumes that defective dies are clustered together.

Smaller dies cost less to produce (since more fit on a wafer, and wafers are processed and priced as a whole), and can help achieve higher yields since smaller dies have a lower chance of having a defect, due to their lower surface area on the wafer. However, smaller dies require smaller features to achieve the same functions of larger dies or surpass them, and smaller features require reduced process variation and increased purity (reduced contamination) to maintain high yields. Metrology tools are used to inspect the wafers during the production process and predict yield, so wafers predicted to have too many defects may be scrapped to save on processing costs.

Die preparation

Once tested, a wafer is typically reduced in thickness in a process also known as "backlap", "backfinish" or "wafer thinning" before the wafer is scored and then broken into individual dies, a process known as wafer dicing. Only the good, unmarked chips are packaged.

Packaging

Plastic or ceramic packaging involves mounting the die, connecting the die pads to the pins on the package, and sealing the die. Tiny bondwires are used to connect the pads to the pins. In the 'old days' (1970s), wires were attached by hand, but now specialized machines perform the task. Traditionally, these wires have been composed of gold, leading to a lead frame (pronounced "leed frame") of solder-plated copper; lead is poisonous, so lead-free "lead frames" are now mandated by RoHS.

Chip scale package (CSP) is another packaging technology. A plastic dual in-line package, like most packages, is many times larger than the actual die hidden inside, whereas CSP chips are nearly the size of the die; a CSP can be constructed for each die before the wafer is diced.

The packaged chips are retested to ensure that they were not damaged during packaging and that the die-to-pin interconnect operation was performed correctly. A laser then etches the chip's name and numbers on the package.

Hazardous materials

Many toxic materials are used in the fabrication process. These include:
 poisonous elemental dopants, such as arsenic, antimony, and phosphorus.
 poisonous compounds, such as arsine, phosphine, tungsten hexafluoride and silane.
 highly reactive liquids, such as hydrogen peroxide, fuming nitric acid, sulfuric acid, and hydrofluoric acid.

It is vital that workers should not be directly exposed to these dangerous substances. The high degree of automation common in the IC fabrication industry helps to reduce the risks of exposure. Most fabrication facilities employ exhaust management systems, such as wet scrubbers, combustors, heated absorber cartridges, etc., to control the risk to workers and to the environment.

Timeline of commercial MOSFET nodes

See also

 Deathnium
 Glossary of microelectronics manufacturing terms
 List of semiconductor scale examples
 MOSFET
 CMOS
 Multigate device
 FinFET
 Semiconductor industry
 Foundry model
 Semiconductor equipment sales leaders by year
 International Technology Roadmap for Semiconductors
 Semiconductor consolidation
 Local oxidation of silicon (LOCOS)
 List of integrated circuit manufacturers
 List of semiconductor fabrication plants
 Microfabrication
 Semiconductor Equipment and Materials International (SEMI) — the semiconductor industry trade association
 SEMI font for labels on wafers
 Etch pit density
 Passivation
 Planar process
 Transistor count

References

Further reading
 , section 14.2.
 Wiki related to Chip Technology

External links

 Semiconductor glossary
 Wafer heating
 Designing a Heated Chuck for Semiconductor Processing Equipment

 
Cleanroom technology
MOSFETs